Timpson High School is a public high school located in Timpson, Texas (USA) and classified as a 2A school by the UIL. It is part of the Timpson Independent School District located in northwest Shelby County. In 2015, the school was rated "Met Standard" by the Texas Education Agency.

Athletics
The Timpson Bears compete in these sports - 

Baseball
Basketball
Cross Country
Football
Powerlifting
Softball
Track and Field
Volleyball

State Titles
Boys Track 
1917(B), 1974(1A), 1979(1A)

References

External links
Timpson ISD

Public high schools in Texas
Education in Shelby County, Texas